Fusiturricula panola is an extinct species of sea snail, a marine gastropod mollusc in the family Drilliidae.

Description
The length of the shell attains 27.2 mm, its diameter 8.5 mm.

Distribution
This marine species has been found as a fossil in Pliocene strata of the Bowden Formation (Jamaica); age range:3.6 to 2.588 Ma

References

 W. P. Woodring. 1928. Miocene Molluscs from Bowden, Jamaica. Part 2: Gastropods and discussion of results . Contributions to the Geology and Palaeontology of the West Indies.

External links

panola
Gastropods described in 1928
Extinct gastropods